Prabhakar, also known as Kalakeya Prabhakar, is an Indian actor who predominently works in Telugu films along with Tamil, Kannada, Malayalam, and Odia films. He is best known for his role as Inkoshi, king of the Kalakeyas in Baahubali: The Beginning (2015). His other notable films include Maryada Ramanna (2010), Dongaata (2015), Jai Simha (2018), Akhanda  (2021). As of July 2022, he has acted in over 120 films in five languages.

Early life
Prabhakar was born in Husnabad, near Raichur. His family hails from Kondangal of Mahabubnagar district, Telangana. After studying in Husnabad, he then shifted to Vikarabad to enroll in Ananta Padmanabha college.

His wife Rajya Lakshmi is a teacher and his son Sriram Rajamouli was named after the famous director Rajamouli who offered him  his first full-fledged role in Maryada Ramanna and gave him 'a new life'. He also has another son Ritvik Preetam.

Career
Prabhakar played a minor role as villain in Mahesh Babu's Athidi, directed by Surender Reddy and supporting artist in his earlier career.

His first breakthrough film as an actor came in 2010 with Maryada Ramanna, directed by S. S. Rajamouli. He also acted in Gabbar Singh, directed by Harish Shankar, Dookudu, Aagadu, Lion and many more, which played well at the box office.

Prabhakar gain recognition following his appearance as a Kalakeya in Baahubali: The Beginning (2015), following which he came to be known as Kalakeya Prabhakar. In 2016, he appeared in Sarrainodu which became the third highest-grossing Telugu film that year. He also starred in Right Right, directed by Manu, starring Sumanth Ashwin and Pooja Zaveri where he played an important role. As of July 2022, he has acted in over 120 films in five languages.

Filmography

Telugu films

Kannada films

Tamil films

Malayalam films

Hindi film
 Bal Ganesh 3 as Vyomasur

Bhojpuri film
 Nayak as Kali Maharaj

Odia film 
Sahari Bagha (2022)

References

External links
 

Living people
Telugu people
Indian male film actors
Male actors in Tamil cinema
People from Raichur district
Male actors in Telugu cinema
Male actors from Karnataka
21st-century Indian male actors
1981 births